Michael Jacob Beloff, KC (born 18 April 1942) is an English barrister and arbitrator. A member of Blackstone Chambers, he practises in a number of areas including human rights, administrative law and sports law.

Career
Beloff is the son of the historian Max Beloff, Baron Beloff, and is therefore by courtesy styled 'the Honourable'. His mother was Helen Dobrin. He was educated at the Dragon School and Eton, and read history at Magdalen College, Oxford, and was President of the Union. As President of the Union he passed a resolution in 1963 to allow women to have full membership for the first time.

He was called to the Bar at Gray's Inn, where he later became a Bencher and was the Treasurer for 2008. He is the founder of a student prize at the Inn awarded for an essay on administrative law.

The term Plate glass university stems from the title of his book The Plateglass Universities (1970).

From 1995 until 2014 he was a member of the Jersey Court of Appeal and the Guernsey Court of Appeal and senior ordinary appeal Judge for six years.  He sits on the Court of Arbitration for Sport (CAS), which deals with disputes including doping offences on behalf of the International Olympic Committee.  He has also chaired the ethics commission of the International Association of Athletics Federations (IAAF), including investigations into IAAF treasurer Valentin Balakhnichev and Papa Massata Diack, son of IAAF president Lamine Diack.

He served as President of Trinity College, Oxford, from 1996 to 2006 and was succeeded by Ivor Roberts. Trinity College now awards a Michael and Judith Beloff Scholarship endowed by Michael.  Trinity College's debating society also runs the annual Michael Beloff After-Dinner Speaking Competition, open to members of the college.

Sources

 Brief CV, Oxford University Faculty of Law website
 Summary of Arbitration Panel adjudication, (accessed 3 July 2007)
Blackstone Chambers Profile of Michael Beloff

References

1942 births
People educated at The Dragon School
People educated at Eton College
Alumni of Magdalen College, Oxford
English King's Counsel
English people of Russian-Jewish descent
20th-century King's Counsel
Presidents of the Oxford Union
Presidents of Trinity College, Oxford
Living people
Members of Gray's Inn
Judiciary of Jersey
English barristers